Miss Canada International & Miss Teen Canada International is a scholarship program for women in Canada. It was founded in 1995 and also has founded in 2005 The Teddy Bears of Hope Campaign in 2005 now "A Not For Profit Foundation" run by a board of directors. Miss Canada International and Miss Teen Canada International was purchased by GND Productions Corp.in 2012.
Miss Canada International Inc. held the rights to send a Canadian representative to Miss World from 1997 to 2002.

Winners

Miss Teen Canada International Winners

References

External links

Beauty pageants in Canada
1995 establishments in Canada
Canadian awards